This is a list of records and statistics of the women's Olympic water polo tournament since the inaugural official edition in 2000.

Abbreviations

General statistics
This is a summary of women's water polo at the Summer Olympics by tournament.

The following table shows winning teams, coaches and captains by tournament. Last updated: 31 March 2021.

Legend
  – Olympic winning streak (winning three or more Olympic titles in a row)
  – Winning all matches during the tournament
  – Host team
 Team† – Defunct team

The following table shows top goalscorers, goalkeepers, sprinters and Most Valuable Players by tournament. Last updated: 31 March 2021.

Notes:
 Top goalscorer: the water polo player who scored the most goals in a tournament.
 Top goalkeeper: the water polo player who saved the most shots in a tournament.
 Top sprinter: the water polo player who won the most sprints in a tournament.
 Most Valuable Player: the water polo player who was named the Most Valuable Player of a tournament.

Legend and abbreviation
  – Olympic winning streak
  – Winning all matches during the tournament
  – Host team
 Team† – Defunct team
 Player‡ – Player who won the tournament with her team
 Eff % – Save efficiency (Saves / Shots)

Confederation statistics

Best performances by tournament
This is a summary of the best performances of each confederation in each tournament. Last updated: 7 August 2021.

Legend
  – Champions
  – Runners-up
  – Third place
  – Fourth place
  – Qualified for forthcoming tournament

All-time best performances
This is a summary of the best performances of each confederation at the Olympics. Last updated: 15 January 2021.

Legend
 Year* – As host team

Team statistics

Comprehensive team results by tournament
Note: Results of Olympic qualification tournaments are not included. Last updated: 7 August 2021.

Legend
  – Champions
  – Runners-up
  – Third place
  – Fourth place
  – Qualified for forthcoming tournament
  – Hosts

Abbreviation
 stats – Olympic water polo team statistics

Number of appearances by team
The following table is pre-sorted by number of appearances (in descending order), year of the last appearance (in ascending order), year of the first appearance (in ascending order), name of the team (in ascending order), respectively. Last updated: 7 August 2021.

Legend and abbreviation
 Year* – As host team
 Apps – Appearances
 stats – Olympic water polo team statistics

Best finishes by team
The following table is pre-sorted by best finish (in descending order), name of the team (in ascending order), respectively. Last updated: 7 August 2021.

Legend and abbreviation
 Year* – As host team
 Apps – Appearances
 stats – Olympic water polo team statistics

Finishes in the top four
The following table is pre-sorted by total finishes in the top four (in descending order), number of Olympic gold medals (in descending order), number of Olympic silver medals (in descending order), number of Olympic bronze medals (in descending order), name of the team (in ascending order), respectively. Last updated: 7 August 2021.

Legend
 Year* – As host team

Medal table
The following table is pre-sorted by number of Olympic gold medals (in descending order), number of Olympic silver medals (in descending order), number of Olympic bronze medals (in descending order), name of the team (in ascending order), respectively. Last updated: 7 August 2021.

The United States is the most successful country in the women's Olympic water polo tournament, with three gold, two silver and one bronze.

Champions (results)

The following table shows results of Olympic champions in women's water polo by tournament. Last updated: 7 August 2021.

Legend
  – Winning 6 matches during the tournament
  – Drawing 4 matches during the tournament
  – Losing 2 matches during the tournament
  – Winning all matches during the tournament
  – Olympic winning streak (winning three or more Olympic titles in a row)
  – Host team

Abbreviation

 MP – Matches played
 W – Won
 D – Drawn
 L – Lost
 GF – Goals for
 GA – Goals against
 GD – Goals difference
 GF/MP – Goals for per match
 GA/MP – Goals against per match
 GD/MP – Goals difference per match

Sources:
 Official Results Books (PDF): 2000 (p. 96), 2004 (p. 72), 2008 (p. 71), 2012 (p. 368), 2016 (p. 218), 2020 (p. 273);
 Olympedia: 2000–2020 (women's tournaments).

The following table shows women's teams that won all matches during the Olympic tournament.

The following tables show records of goals for per match.

The following tables show records of goals against per match.

The following tables show records of goals difference per match.

Champions (squads)

The following table shows number of players and average age, height and weight of Olympic champions in women's water polo by tournament. Last updated: 7 August 2021.

Legend
  – Olympic winning streak
  – Winning all matches during the tournament
  – Host team

Sources:
 Official Results Books (PDF): 2000 (p. 96), 2004 (p. 73), 2008 (p. 72), 2012 (p. 369), 2016 (p. 219), 2020 (p. 274);
 Olympedia: 2000–2020 (women's tournaments).

The following tables show records of the number of returning Olympians.

The following tables show records of average age.

The following tables show records of average height.

The following tables show records of average weight.

Olympic and world champions (teams)

Team records

Player statistics

Age records
The following tables show the oldest and youngest players who competed in women's water polo at the Summer Olympics, and the oldest and youngest female Olympic medalists in water polo. Last updated: 12 August 2021.

Legend
  – Host team
 Player‡ – Player who won the tournament with her team

Appearance

Medalist

Multiple appearances (four-time Olympians)

The following table is pre-sorted by number of Olympic appearances (in descending order), year of the last Olympic appearance (in ascending order), year of the first Olympic appearance (in ascending order), date of birth (in ascending order), name of the player (in ascending order), respectively. Last updated: 7 August 2021.

Eight female athletes competed in water polo at four or more Olympic Games between 2000 and 2020 inclusive.

Legend
  – Hosts
 Apps – Appearances

Multiple medalists

The following table is pre-sorted by total number of Olympic medals (in descending order), number of Olympic gold medals (in descending order), number of Olympic silver medals (in descending order), year of receiving the last Olympic medal (in ascending order), year of receiving the first Olympic medal (in ascending order), name of the player (in ascending order), respectively. Last updated: 7 August 2021.

Heather Petri and Brenda Villa, both representing the United States, are the only two female athletes to win four Olympic medals in water polo.

Legend
  – Hosts

Sources:
 Sports Reference: Athlete Medal Leaders (1900–2016);
 Official Results Books (PDF): 2000 (p. 28), 2004 (p. 2), 2008 (p. 2), 2012 (p. 285), 2016 (p. 135), 2020 (p. 156).

Multiple gold medalists

The following table is pre-sorted by number of Olympic gold medals (in descending order), number of Olympic silver medals (in descending order), number of Olympic bronze medals (in descending order), year of receiving the last Olympic gold medal (in ascending order), year of receiving the first Olympic gold medal (in ascending order), name of the player (in ascending order), respectively. Last updated: 7 August 2021.

Two female athletes won three or more Olympic gold medals in water polo. They were both members of the United States women's national water polo team that won three consecutive Olympic gold medals in 2012, 2016 and 2021.

Legend
  – Hosts

Top goalscorers (one match)

The following table is pre-sorted by date of the match (in ascending order), name of the player (in ascending order), respectively. Last updated: 1 April 2021.

Three female water polo players have each scored seven goals in an Olympic match.

The first woman to do so was Daniëlle de Bruijn, with the Netherlands women's national team in Beijing on 21 August 2008. She netted seven goals in the gold medal match, helping the Dutch team win the Olympics.

The most recent female player to do so was Roser Tarragó, with Spain women's national team in Rio de Janeiro on 19 August 2016.

Legend and abbreviation

  – Player's team drew the match
  – Player's team lost the match
  – Host team
 Player‡ – Player who won the tournament with her team
 G – Goals
 aet – After extra time
 pso – Penalty shootout

The following table shows the historical progression of the record of goals scored by a female water polo player in a single Olympic match. Last updated: 1 April 2021.

Legend
  – Host team
 Player‡ – Player who won the tournament with his team

Top goalscorers (one tournament)

The following table is pre-sorted by number of goals (in descending order), edition of the Olympics (in ascending order), number of matches played (in ascending order), name of the player (in ascending order), respectively. Last updated: 12 August 2021.

Seven female players have scored 18 or more goals in an Olympic water polo tournament.

At the 2020 Summer Olympics, Dutch left-hander Simone van de Kraats scored 28 goals, setting the record for the most goals scored by a female water polo player in a single Olympic tournament.

Maggie Steffens of the United States is the first and only female water polo player to achieve this feat twice. At the 2012 Summer Olympics, Steffens netted 21 goals. Nine years later, she scored 18 goals in Tokyo.

Legend
  – Host team
 Player‡ – Player who won the tournament with her team

Source:
 Official Results Books (PDF): 2000 (pp. 96–101), 2004 (p. 53), 2008 (p. 54), 2012 (p. 345), 2016 (p. 193), 2020 (p. 234).

The following table is pre-sorted by edition of the Olympics (in ascending order), number of matches played (in ascending order), name of the player (in ascending order), respectively. Last updated: 12 August 2021.

At 19 years old, Maggie Steffens of the United States made her Olympic debut at the 2012 London Olympics, where she was the youngest-ever female top goalscorer with 21 goals. She was also the top goalscorer at the 2016 Rio Olympics, with 17 goals.

Dutch left-handed player Daniëlle de Bruijn was the joint top goalscorer at the 2000 Olympics, with 11 goals. Eight years later she netted 17 goals, including seven goals in the gold medal match, becoming the top goalscorer at the 2008 Olympics.

Legend
  – Host team
 Player‡ – Player who won the tournament with her team

Source:
 Official Results Books (PDF): 2000 (pp. 96–101), 2004 (p. 53), 2008 (p. 54), 2012 (p. 345), 2016 (p. 193), 2020 (p. 234).

The following table shows the historical progression of the record of goals scored by a female water polo player in a single Olympic tournament. Last updated: 12 August 2021.

Legend
  – Host team
 Player‡ – Player who won the tournament with her team

Top goalscorers (all-time)

The following table is pre-sorted by number of total goals (in descending order), number of total Olympic matches played (in ascending order), date of the last Olympic match played (in ascending order), date of the first Olympic match played (in ascending order), name of the player (in ascending order), respectively. Last updated: 7 August 2021.

Three-time Olympian Maggie Steffens of the United States holds the record for the most goals scored by a female water polo player in Olympic history, with 56 goals.

Italian Tania Di Mario netted 47 goals at four Olympics (2004–2016).

Ma Huanhuan, representing China, holds the record for the most goals scored by an Asian female water polo player in Olympic history, with 37 goals at three Olympics (2008–2016).

Kate Gynther of Australia netted 30 goals in 32 matches between 2004 and 2012.

Legend
  – Hosts

Source:
 Official Results Books (PDF): 2000 (pp. 96–101), 2004 (p. 53), 2008 (p. 54), 2012 (p. 345), 2016 (p. 193).

The following table shows the historical progression of the record of total goals scored by a female water polo player at the Summer Olympics. Last updated: 7 August 2021.

Legend
  – Host team
 Player‡ – Player who won the tournament with her team

Top goalkeepers (one match)

The following table is pre-sorted by date of the match (in ascending order), name of the goalkeeper (in ascending order), respectively. Last updated: 1 April 2021.

Five female water polo goalkeepers have each saved fifteen or more shots in an Olympic match.

The first woman to do so was Patrícia Horváth, with Hungary women's national team in Beijing. She blocked 19 shots on 11 August 2008, setting the record for the most shots saved by a female water polo goalkeeper in a single Olympic match.

The most recent female goalkeeper to do so was Yang Jun, with China women's national team in Rio de Janeiro on 19 August 2016.

Legend and abbreviation

  – Player's team drew the match
  – Player's team lost the match
  – Host team
 Player‡ – Player who won the tournament with her team
 aet – After extra time
 pso – Penalty shootout
 ORB – Official Results Books

The following table shows the historical progression of the record of shots saved by a female water polo goalkeeper in a single Olympic match. Last updated: 1 April 2021.

Legend
  – Host team
 Player‡ – Player who won the tournament with her team
 ORB – Official Results Books

Top goalkeepers (one tournament)

The following table is pre-sorted by number of saves (in descending order), edition of the Olympics (in ascending order), number of matches played (in ascending order), name of the goalkeeper (in ascending order), respectively. Last updated: 1 April 2021.

Six female goalkeepers have saved 50 or more shots in an Olympic water polo tournament.

Giulia Gorlero of Italy holds the record for the most saves by a female water polo goalkeeper in a single Olympic tournament, blocking 65 shots in the 2016 edition.

At the 2016 Summer Games, Ashleigh Johnson saved 51 shots, including nine in the gold medal match, helping the American team win the Olympics. She is the most efficient one among these six goalkeepers.

Legend and abbreviation
  – Host team
 Player‡ – Player who won the tournament with her team
 MP – Matches played
 Eff % – Save efficiency (Saves / Shots)
  – Highest save efficiency

Source:
 Official Results Books (PDF): 2000 (pp. 96–101), 2004 (p. 49), 2008 (p. 50), 2012 (p. 341), 2016 (p. 195).

The following table is pre-sorted by edition of the Olympics (in ascending order), number of matches played (in ascending order), name of the goalkeeper (in ascending order), respectively. Last updated: 1 April 2021.

At the 2004 Summer Games, Jacqueline Frank saved 41 shots, including seven in the bronze medal match, helping the United States win the match.

Giulia Gorlero of Italy blocked 65 shots at the 2016 Olympics, helping the Italian team win the Olympic silver medal.

Legend and abbreviation
  – Host team
 Player‡ – Player who won the tournament with her team
 MP – Matches played
 Eff % – Save efficiency (Saves / Shots)

Source:
 Official Results Books (PDF): 2000 (pp. 96–101), 2004 (p. 49), 2008 (p. 50), 2012 (p. 341), 2016 (p. 195).

The following table shows the historical progression of the record of shots saved by a female water polo goalkeeper in a single Olympic tournament. Last updated: 1 April 2021.

Legend
  – Host team
 Player‡ – Player who won the tournament with her team

Top goalkeepers (all-time)

The following table is pre-sorted by number of total saves (in descending order), number of total Olympic matches played (in ascending order), date of the last Olympic match played (in ascending order), date of the first Olympic match played (in ascending order), name of the goalkeeper (in ascending order), respectively. Last updated: 1 April 2021.

Yang Jun of China holds the record for the most shots saved by a female water polo goalkeeper at the Olympics, with 138 saves at three Olympics (2008–2016).

Elizabeth Armstrong, representing the United States, blocked 102 shots at two Olympics (2008–2012).

Legend
  – Hosts

Source:
 Official Results Books (PDF): 2000 (pp. 96–101), 2004 (p. 49), 2008 (p. 50), 2012 (p. 341), 2016 (p. 195).

The following table shows the historical progression of the record of total shots saved by a female water polo goalkeeper at the Summer Olympics. Last updated: 1 April 2021.

Legend
  – Host team
 Player‡ – Player who won the tournament with her team

Top sprinters (one tournament)

The following table is pre-sorted by number of sprints won (in descending order), edition of the Olympics (in ascending order), number of sprints contested (in ascending order), name of the player (in ascending order), respectively. Last updated: 13 August 2021.

Four female players have won 20 or more sprints in an Olympic water polo tournament.

At the 2020 Tokyo Olympics, Vanda Vályi won 27 sprints, helping Hungary win bronze. She is the most efficient one among these four sprinters.

Legend and abbreviation
  – Host team
 Player‡ – Player who won the tournament with his team
 Eff % – Efficiency (Sprints won / Sprints contested)
  – Highest efficiency

Source:
 Official Results Books (PDF): 2000 (p. 102), 2004 (p. 52), 2008 (p. 53), 2012 (p. 344), 2016 (p. 192).

The following table is pre-sorted by edition of the Olympics (in ascending order), number of sprints contested (in ascending order), name of the player (in ascending order), respectively. Last updated: 13 August 2021.

Kate Gynther, captain of the Australia women's national team, and Jennifer Pareja, captain of the Spain women's national team, were the joint top sprinters at the 2012 London Olympics.

At the 2020 Summer Olympics, Hungarian Vanda Vályi won 27 sprints, setting the record for the most sprints won by a female water polo player in a single Olympic tournament.

Legend and abbreviation
  – Host team
 Player‡ – Player who won the tournament with his team
 Eff % – Efficiency (Sprints won / Sprints contested)

Source:
 Official Results Books (PDF): 2000 (p. 102), 2004 (p. 52), 2008 (p. 53), 2012 (p. 344), 2016 (p. 192).

The following table shows the historical progression of the record of sprints won by a female water polo player in a single Olympic tournament. Last updated: 13 August 2021.

Legend
  – Host team
 Player‡ – Player who won the tournament with his team

Top sprinters (all-time)
The following table is pre-sorted by number of total sprints won (in descending order), number of total sprints contested (in ascending order), year of the last Olympic appearance (in ascending order), year of the first Olympic appearance (in ascending order), name of the player (in ascending order), respectively. Last updated: 15 May 2021.

Australian Kate Gynther holds the record for the most sprints won by a female water polo player at the Olympics, with 39 sprints won at three Olympics (2004–2012).

Wang Yi of China won 35 sprints in two Olympic tournaments between 2008 and 2012.

Legend and abbreviation
  – Hosts
 Eff % – Efficiency (Sprints won / Sprints contested)

Source:
 Official Results Books (PDF): 2000 (p. 102), 2004 (p. 52), 2008 (p. 53), 2012 (p. 344), 2016 (p. 192).

The following table shows the historical progression of the record of total sprints won by a female water polo player at the Summer Olympics. Last updated: 15 May 2021.

Legend
  – Host team
 Player‡ – Player who won the tournament with his team

All-star teams by tournament
This is a summary of women's Olympic all-star teams by tournament. Last updated: 1 April 2021.

Legend and abbreviation
 Player‡ – Player who won the tournament with her team
 LH – Left-handed
 Eff % – Save efficiency (Saves / Shots)

Olympic and world champions (players)

Olympic champion families

Coach statistics

Most successful coaches
The following table is pre-sorted by total number of Olympic medals (in descending order), number of Olympic gold medals (in descending order), number of Olympic silver medals (in descending order), year of winning the last Olympic medal (in ascending order), year of winning the first Olympic medal (in ascending order), name of the coach (in ascending order), respectively. Last updated: 31 March 2021.

There are three coaches who led women's national water polo teams to win two or more Olympic medals.

Guy Baker guided the United States women's national team to three Olympic medals in a row between 2000 and 2008.

Adam Krikorian coached the United States women's national team to two consecutive Olympic gold medals in 2012 and 2016.

Greg McFadden led Australia women's national team to win two consecutive Olympic bronze medals in 2008 and 2012.

Legend
  – Hosts

Medals as coach and player

The following table is pre-sorted by total number of Olympic medals (in descending order), number of Olympic gold medals (in descending order), number of Olympic silver medals (in descending order), year of winning the last Olympic medal (in ascending order), year of winning the first Olympic medal (in ascending order), name of the person (in ascending order), respectively. Last updated: 31 March 2021.

As of 2016, two water polo players won Olympic medals and then guided women's national water polo teams to the Olympic podium as head coaches.

With the Hungary men's national water polo team, István Görgényi won a silver medal at the 1972 Summer Olympics in Munich. He was appointed head coach of the Australia women's national team in 1998. At the 2000 Sydney Olympics, he led the team to win the inaugural women's water polo gold medal.

Spanish water polo player Miki Oca won a silver medal at the 1992 Summer Olympics in Barcelona. Four years later, he won a gold medal at the 1996 Olympics in Atlanta. As a head coach, he guided Spain women's national water polo team to a silver medal at the 2012 London Olympics.

Legend
 Year* – As host team

Olympic and world champions (coaches)

See also
 Water polo at the Summer Olympics

 Lists of Olympic water polo records and statistics
 List of men's Olympic water polo tournament records and statistics
 List of Olympic champions in men's water polo
 List of Olympic champions in women's water polo
 National team appearances in the men's Olympic water polo tournament
 National team appearances in the women's Olympic water polo tournament
 List of players who have appeared in multiple men's Olympic water polo tournaments
 List of players who have appeared in multiple women's Olympic water polo tournaments
 List of Olympic medalists in water polo (men)
 List of Olympic medalists in water polo (women)
 List of men's Olympic water polo tournament top goalscorers
 List of women's Olympic water polo tournament top goalscorers
 List of men's Olympic water polo tournament goalkeepers
 List of women's Olympic water polo tournament goalkeepers
 List of Olympic venues in water polo

 FINA Water Polo World Rankings
 List of water polo world medalists
 Major achievements in water polo by nation

References

Sources

Official Results Books (IOC)
PDF documents in the LA84 Foundation Digital Library:
 Official Results Book – 2000 Olympic Games – Water Polo (download, archive)
 Official Results Book – 2004 Olympic Games – Water Polo (download, archive)
 Official Results Book – 2008 Olympic Games – Water Polo (download, archive)

PDF documents on the FINA website:
 Official Results Book – 2012 Olympic Games – Diving, Swimming, Synchronised Swimming, Water Polo (archive) (pp. 284–507)

PDF documents in the Olympic World Library:
 Official Results Book – 2016 Olympic Games – Water Polo (archive)

PDF documents on the International Olympic Committee website:
 Official Results Book – 2020 Olympic Games – Water Polo (archive)

Official Reports (FINA)
PDF documents on the FINA website:
 HistoFINA – Water polo medalists and statistics (as of September 2019) (archive) (p. 56)
 1870–2020 | 150 years of Water Polo – Evolution of its rules (archive)

Official website (IOC)
Water polo on the International Olympic Committee website:
 Water polo
 Women's water polo

Olympedia
Water polo on the Olympedia website:

 Water polo
 Women's water polo
 Athlete count for water polo
 Water polo venues
 Water polo at the 2000 Summer Olympics (women's tournament)
 Water polo at the 2004 Summer Olympics (women's tournament)
 Water polo at the 2008 Summer Olympics (women's tournament)
 Water polo at the 2012 Summer Olympics (women's tournament)
 Water polo at the 2016 Summer Olympics (women's tournament)
 Water polo at the 2020 Summer Olympics (women's tournament)

Sports Reference
Water polo on the Sports Reference website:

 Country Medal Leaders & Athlete Medal Leaders (1900–2016) (archived)
 Women's water polo (2000–2016) (archived)
 Water polo at the 2000 Summer Games (women's tournament) (archived)
 Water polo at the 2004 Summer Games (women's tournament) (archived)
 Water polo at the 2008 Summer Games (women's tournament) (archived)
 Water polo at the 2012 Summer Games (women's tournament) (archived)
 Water polo at the 2016 Summer Games (women's tournament) (archived)

Todor66
Water polo on the Todor66 website:

 Water polo at the Summer Games
 Water polo at the 2000 Summer Olympics (women's tournament, women's qualification)
 Water polo at the 2004 Summer Olympics (women's tournament, women's qualification)
 Water polo at the 2008 Summer Olympics (women's tournament, women's qualification)
 Water polo at the 2012 Summer Olympics (women's tournament, women's qualification)
 Water polo at the 2016 Summer Olympics (women's tournament, women's qualification)
 Water polo at the 2020 Summer Olympics (women's tournament, women's qualification)

External links
 Olympic water polo – Official website

!Women